Marčani  is a village in Croatia. 

Populated places in Bjelovar-Bilogora County